Munditiella qualum is a species of minute sea snail, a marine gastropod mollusk in the family Skeneidae.

Description
The height of the shell is 0.75 mm, its diameter 1.8 mm. The white shell has a scarcely elevated spire. It is widely umbilicated. The three whorls are flattened below the suture. They are rounded at the periphery and co, cave at the base. The body whorl is ornamented with twenty, broad, squarely projecting, transverse ribs. These arise at a distance from the suture, enlarge to the periphery and continue to the basal angle. These ribs vanish on the penultimate whorl. Close, regular and fine, raised spiral lines cover the whole shell, crossing the ribs and interstices alike. These are in their turn overridden by transverse microscopic threads. The base of the shell is excavate in the centre. The umbilicus measures one-fifth of the shell's diameter, exhibiting the previous whorls. The aperture is round. The  outer lip is thickened, above spreading on the previous whorl and at the base projecting a callus tongue into the umbilicus.

Distribution
This species occurs in the Pacific Ocean off  Indo-Malaysia, the Western Pacific and off Tuvalu; off Queensland, Australia.

References

 Hedley, C. 1899. The Mollusca of Funafuti. Part 1. Gastropoda. Memoirs of the Australian Museum 3(7): 395-488
 Hedley, C. 1907. Mollusca of Mast Head Reef, Queensland. Part 2. Proceedings of the Linnean Society of New South Wales. 32 : 476-513, pls 16-21

qualum
Gastropods described in 1899